Xabier 'Xabi' Iruretagoiena Arantzamendi (born 21 March 1986), commonly known as Irureta, is a Spanish footballer who plays as a goalkeeper for FC La Unión Atlético.

He spent most of his professional career with Eibar, representing the club in all three major levels of Spanish football while appearing in 229 matches in all competitions.

Club career

Eibar
Born in Ondarroa, Biscay, Irureta made his senior debut with local Real Unión in the 2005–06 season, in the Segunda División B. In summer 2006, he moved to amateurs CD Aurrerá Ondarroa also in his native Basque Country.

In July 2007, Irureta joined SD Eibar, being initially assigned to the reserves in the Tercera División. He played his first game as a professional on 30 May 2009, starting in a 3–0 Segunda División away loss against Xerez CD, and made a further three appearances during the campaign as the side suffered relegation after finishing in 21st position.

Irureta was definitely promoted to the main squad in July 2009, being named first choice ahead of Zigor Goikuria. In 2012–13, he appeared in 46 matches (34 in the league, 4,126 minutes of action) to help Eibar return to the second division after a four-year absence.

On 20 February 2014, Irureta signed a new two-year deal with the club, which was promoted to La Liga for the first time ever. He made his debut in the competition on 24 August aged 28, in a 1–0 home victory over Real Sociedad.

Zaragoza
On 20 July 2016, free agent Irureta agreed to a two-year contract at Real Zaragoza of the second tier. On 1 September of the following year, after losing his starting position to youth graduate Álvaro Ratón, he left.

Delhi Dynamos
Irureta moved abroad on 4 January 2018, joining Indian Super League franchise Delhi Dynamos FC. He made his debut in the competition three days later, in a 2–2 away draw against Chennaiyin FC.

Career statistics

Club

References

External links

1986 births
Living people
People from Ondarroa
Sportspeople from Biscay
Spanish footballers
Footballers from the Basque Country (autonomous community)
Association football goalkeepers
La Liga players
Segunda División players
Segunda División B players
Tercera División players
Tercera Federación players
Real Unión footballers
SD Eibar footballers
Real Zaragoza players
UD San Sebastián de los Reyes players
Villarrubia CF players
Indian Super League players
Odisha FC players
Basque Country international footballers
Spanish expatriate footballers
Expatriate footballers in India
Spanish expatriate sportspeople in India